ElbaFly was a broker based in Elba, and organised flights to and from Italy.

Destinations
The last destinations of ElbaFly were:

Florence - Florence Airport, Peretola
Milan - Malpensa Airport seasonal
Marina di Campo - Marina di Campo Airport
Pisa - Pisa International Airport

Fleet
The Elbafly chartered fleet included the following aircraft (as of 21 September 2008):

1 Let L-410 Turbolet (which was operated by Silver Air)

See also
 List of defunct airlines of Italy

External links
Official website

Defunct airlines of Italy